The Department of Education and Early Childhood Development is an executive agency of the Government of New Brunswick, Canada. It is responsible for the administration of the New Brunswick public education system. Its primary and secondary schools are divided into seven districts in separate units; four anglophone districts and three francophone districts.

On May 14, 1998 it also took over responsibility for universities and community colleges however community colleges were later moved to the Department of Training and Employment Development on March 23, 2000. On February 14, 2006 it was returned to its pre-1998 configuration with responsibility for just primary and secondary schools when universities were moved to the new Department of Post-secondary Education and Training.

In October 2010, it took responsibility for early childhood education from the Department of Social Development and its name changed from the Department of Education to the Department of Education and Early Childhood Development.

Ministers

See also
New Brunswick Department of Education District 17

References

External links
Department of Education

Early childhood educational organizations
Education in New Brunswick
New Brunswick
Education
New Brunswick